Filip-Emanuel Lazăr (born 17 April 1990) is a former Romanian rugby union footballer and currently a kinesiologist. He played as a centre.

Club career
Filip Lazăr started playing rugby with Romanian youth club Cleopatra Mamaia under the guidance of coaches Nicoale Dinu and Adrian Tinca. His next club was LPS "Nicolae Rotaru" where he was coached by Virgil Năstase. After finishing his junior years, Lazăr was signed by SuperLiga side, Farul Constanța. After some time with his native club, Lazăr moved to France and joined Fédérale 2 club, Rugby Club Trignacais. In order to improve his abilities, he signed to Fédérale 1 side, Rugby athletic club angérien. After some impressive performances in France, he was signed by Romanian giants, Steaua București. AFter just one season with the Red and blues he once again moved to France and played for three seasons for what would become his last career club, Beauvais Rugby Club.

Provincial / State sides
Lazăr was also selected in 2014 for the State side assembled to play in the European Cups, namely București Wolves.

International career
Lazăr was also selected for Romania's national team, the Oaks, making his international debut during the 2014 IRB Nations Cup in a test match against Los Teros.

References

External links

1990 births
Living people
Sportspeople from Constanța
Romanian rugby union players
Romania international rugby union players
RCJ Farul Constanța players
CSA Steaua București (rugby union) players
București Wolves players
Rugby union centres